Panthera atrox, better known as the American lion, also called the North American lion, or American cave lion, is an extinct pantherine cat that lived in North America during the Pleistocene epoch and the early Holocene epoch, about 340,000 to 11,000 years ago.
Its fossils have been excavated from Alaska to Mexico. Genetic analysis has shown that the American lion and the Late Pleistocene Eurasian cave lion (Panthera spelaea) are sister lineages.
It was about 25% larger than the modern lion, making it one of the largest known felids.

History and taxonomy

Initial discovery and North American fossils 

The first specimen now assigned to Panthera atrox was collected in the 1830s and placed in the collection of by William Henry Huntingtion Esquire, who announced their discovery to the American Philosophical Society on April 1, 1836 and placed with other fossils from Huntington's collection in the Academy of Natural Sciences in Philadelphia. The specimen had been collected in ravines in Natchez, Mississippi and that were dated to the Pleistocene and the specimen consisted only of a partial left mandible with 3 molars and a partial canine. The fossils didn't get proper description until in 1853, Joseph Leidy named the fragmentary specimen (ANSP 12546), Felis atrox ("savage cat") Leidy named another species seen as synonymous with P. atrox in 1873, Felis imperialis ("imperial cat"), based on a mandible fragment from Pleistocene gravels in Livermore Valley, California.  

Few additional discoveries came until 1907, when the American Museum of Natural History and College, Alaska collected several Panthera atrox skulls in a locality originally found in 1803 by gold miners in Kotzebue, Alaska. The skulls were referred to a new subspecies of Felis (Panthera) atrox in 1930, Felis atrox "alaskensis". Despite this, the species didn’t get a proper description and is now seen as a nomen nudum synonymous with Panthera atrox. Further south in Rancho La Brea, California, a large Felid skull was excavated and later described in 1909 by John C. Merriam, who referred it to a new subspecies of Felis atrox, Felis atrox bebbi. The subspecies is synonymous with Panthera atrox. 

Throughout the early to mid 1900s, dozens of fossils of Panthera atrox were excavated at La Brea, including many postcranial elements and associated skeletons. The fossils were described by Merriam & Stock in detail in 1932, who synonymized many previously named taxa with Felis atrox. At least 80 individuals are known from La Brea Tar Pits and the fossils define the subspecies, giving a comprehensive view of the taxon. It wasn’t until 1941 that George Simpson moved Felis atrox to Panthera, believing that it was a subspecies of jaguar. Simpson also referred several fossils from central Mexico, even as far south as Chiapas, as well as Nebraska and other regions of the western US to P. atrox. 1971 witnessed the description of fragmentary remains from Alberta, Canada that extended P. atrox’s range north. In 2009, an entrapment site at Natural Trap Cave, Wyoming was briefly described and is the second most productive Panthera atrox-bearing fossil site. It most importantly contains well preserved mitochondrial DNA of many partial skeletons.

Panthera onca mesembrina and possible South American material 
In the 1890s in the “Cueva del Milodon” in southern Chile, fossil collector Rodolfo Hauthal collected a fragmentary postcranial skeleton of a large Felid that he sent to Santiago Roth who described them as a new genus and species of Felid, "Iemish listai", in 1899, though the name is considered a nomen nudum. 5 years later in 1904, Roth reassessed the phylogenetic affinities of “Iemish” and named it Felis listai and referred several cranial and fragmentary postcranial elements to the taxon. Notably, several mandibles, a partial skull, and pieces of skin were some of the specimens referred. 30 years later in 1934, Felis onca mesembrina was named by Angel Cabrera based on that partial skull from “Cueva del Milodon” and the other material from the site was referred to it. Unfortunately, the skull (MLP 10-90) was lost, and was only illustrated by Cabrera. Further material, including feces and mandibles, was referred to as F. onca mesembrina from Tierra del Fuego, Argentina and southern other sites in Chile. 

In 2016, the subspecies was referred to Panthera onca in a genetic study, which supported its identity as a subspecies of jaguar. Later in 2017, the subspecies was synonymized with Panthera atrox based on morphological similarities of all material, although these similarities are unreliable.

Evolution 
The American lion was initially considered a distinct species of Pantherinae, and designated as Panthera atrox , which means "cruel" or "fearsome panther" in Latin. Some paleontologists accepted this view, but others considered it to be a type of lion closely related to the modern lion (Panthera leo) and its extinct relative, the Eurasian cave lion (Panthera leo spelaea or P. spelaea). It was later assigned as a subspecies of P. leo (P. leo atrox) rather than as a separate species. Most recently, both spelaea and atrox have been treated as full species.

Cladistic studies using morphological characteristics have been unable to resolve the phylogenetic position of the American lion. One study considered the American lion, along with the cave lion, to be most closely related to the tiger (Panthera tigris), citing a comparison of the skull; the braincase, in particular, appears to be especially similar to the braincase of a tiger. Another study suggested that the American lion and the Eurasian cave lion were successive offshoots of a lineage leading to a leopard-extant lion clade. A more recent study comparing the skull and jaw of the American lion with other pantherines concluded that it was not a lion but a distinct species. It was proposed that it arose from pantherines that migrated to North America during the mid-Pleistocene and gave rise to American lions and jaguars (Panthera onca). Another study grouped the American lion with P. leo and P. tigris, and ascribed morphological similarities to P. onca to convergent evolution, rather than phylogenetic affinity.

Mitochondrial DNA sequence data from fossil remains suggests that the American lion (P. atrox) represents a sister lineage to the Eurasian cave lion (P. spelaea), and likely arose when an early cave lion population became isolated south of the North American continental ice sheet about 340,000 years ago. The most recent common ancestor of the P. atrox lineage is estimated to have lived about 200,000 (118,000 to 346,000) years ago. This implies that it became genetically isolated from P. spelaea before the start of the Illinoian glaciation; a spelaea population is known to have been present in eastern Beringia by that time, where it persisted until at least 11,925 ± 70 years ago. This separation was maintained during the interstadials of the Illinoian and following Wisconsin glaciations as well as during the Sangamonian interglacial between them. Boreal forests may have contributed to the separation during warmer intervals; alternatively, a reproductive barrier may have existed.

The study also indicates that the modern lion is the closest living relative of P. atrox and P. spelaea. The lineages leading to extant lions and atrox/spelaea were thought to have diverged about 1.9 million years ago, before a whole genome-wide sequence of lions from Africa and Asia by Marc de Manuel et al. showed that the lineage of the cave lion diverged from that of the modern lion around 392,000 – 529,000 years ago.

Description 
 
Thus, it was much smaller than its contemporary competitor, the North American giant short-faced bear; and significantly smaller than the saber-toothed cat Smilodon populator, which exceeded  in weight (S. populator is believed to be the largest and most powerful cat to have ever lived). The body composition of Panthera atrox is 57.1 % skeletal muscle, 12.4 % bone, 11.8 % organs, 11.5 % skin and fur, 2.67 % adipose tissue and 4.62 % blood and waste.

About 80 American lion individuals have been recovered from the La Brea Tar Pits in Los Angeles, so their morphology is well known. Their features strongly resemble those of modern lions, but they were considerably larger, similar to P. spelaea and the Pleistocene Natodomeri lion of eastern Africa.

Preserved skin remains found with skeletal material thought by its describers to be from the American lion in caves in the Argentine Patagonia indicate that the animal was reddish in color. Cave paintings from El Ceibo in the Santa Cruz Province of Argentina seem to confirm this, and reduce the possibility of confusion with fossil jaguars, as similar cave paintings accurately depict the jaguar as yellow in color.

Distribution 
The earliest lions known in the Americas south of Alaska are from the Sangamonian Stage – the last interglacial period – following which, the American lion spread from Alberta to Maryland, reaching as far south as Chiapas, Mexico. It was generally not found in the same areas as the jaguar, which favored forests over open habitats. It was absent from eastern Canada and the northeastern United States, perhaps due to the presence of dense boreal forests in the region. The American lion was formerly believed to have colonized northwestern South America as part of the Great American Interchange. However, the fossil remains found in the tar pits of Talara, Peru actually belong to an unusually large jaguar. On the other hand, fossils of a large felid from late Pleistocene localities in southern Chile and Argentina traditionally identified as an extinct subspecies of jaguar, Panthera onca mesembrina, have been reported to be remains of the American lion.

Habitat

The American lion inhabited savannas and grasslands like the modern lion. In some areas of their range, American lions lived under cold climatic conditions. They probably used caves for shelter from the cold weather in those areas, and might have lined their dens with grass or leaves, as the modern Siberian tiger does.

The remains of American lions are not as abundant as those of other predators like Smilodon fatalis or dire wolves (Aenocyon dirus) at the La Brea Tar Pits, which suggests that they were better at evading entrapment, possibly due to greater intelligence. American lions likely preyed on deer, horses, camels, tapirs, American bison, mammoths, and other large ungulates (hoofed mammals). Evidence for predation of bison by American lions is particularly strong as a mummified carcass nicknamed "Blue Babe" was discovered in Alaska with clear bite and claw marks from lions. Based on the largely intact nature of the carcass, it probably froze before the lions could devour it. The American lion went extinct along with most of the Pleistocene megafauna during the Quaternary extinction event. The most recent fossil, from Edmonton, dates to 11,355 ± 55 years ago. American lion bones have been found in the trash heaps of Paleolithic Native Americans, suggesting that human predation contributed to its extinction.

A replica of the jaw of the first American lion specimen to be discovered can be seen in the hand of a statue of famous paleontologist Joseph Leidy, currently standing outside the Academy of Natural Sciences in Philadelphia.

See also 

 Panthera leo fossilis
 List of largest carnivorans
 List of largest prehistoric carnivorans	
 Megafauna

Notes

References 

Pleistocene carnivorans
Prehistoric pantherines
Prehistoric mammals of North America
Pleistocene mammals of North America
Extinct animals of the United States
Fossil taxa described in 1853
Apex predators